James Cardwell or Jim Cardwell is the name of:

 James Cardwell (actor) (1921–1954), American actor, born Albert Cardwell
 James B. Cardwell (1922–2012), American bureaucrat
 James F. Cardwell, film producer and former president of Warner Home Video
 James Moss Cardwell (1926–1990), American author who used the pen name Adobe James
 Jim Cardwell (1916–1996), Australian footballer